No Control is the fourth album by American punk rock band Bad Religion, released on November 2, 1989, through Epitaph Records. Bad Religion began work on the album while touring in support of their previous album, Suffer (1988). No Control is stylistically faster than its predecessor, owing more to hardcore punk. Additionally, it was the first Bad Religion album not to feature a lineup change from the previous album.

No Control brought Bad Religion a small amount of success in Southern California as the band started to gather a following. By 1992, about 80,000 copies were sold and it is often considered to be a landmark in hardcore punk. It contains many of the band's live staples, such as "Change of Ideas", "Big Bang", "No Control", "Sometimes I Feel Like", "Automatic Man", "I Want to Conquer the World", "Sanity" and "You". Up until 2019, the only songs from No Control that had never been performed live were "Progress" and "The World Won't Stop".  The songs were live debuted when Bad Religion played the album in its entirety at the Roxy on April 5, 2019.

Background and recording 
After a long-term hiatus, Bad Religion reformed in 1987 with a new lineup, releasing the studio album Suffer in 1988. Although Suffer was not a commercial success, the band earned a growing fan base in the underground music community and critical acclaim with that album and it managed to sell 4,000 copies. While Bad Religion continued touring in support of Suffer, Greg Graffin and Brett Gurewitz began writing songs in late 1988/early 1989 for the band's next record. Bassist Jay Bentley commented on the making of No Control, stating that "songs were being written all the time. I wouldn't go so far as to say an 'album's worth', but during the U.S. and subsequent European tour into '89, lots of ideas were coming to fruition. I would think that more songs were written during the down time between tours and 'perfected' on the road." Recording for No Control took place in June 1989 at Westbeach Recorders (where Suffer and the band's later albums were recorded) and it was the band's first experience recording an album on a half-inch two track. Gurewitz noted that he put every track through a compellor by using Aphex Systems, then, having completed this, he decided he hated the "weird sound" this had produced. As a result, he recalls spending a great deal of effort during the mixing stage to remove the compression. The overall result was an "aggressive and distinctive" sound which he now favors. Contrary to rumor, "21st Century (Digital Boy)" (which appears on Against the Grain and again on Stranger than Fiction) was not written and recorded for this album.

Release and reception 

No Control was released through Epitaph Records on November 2, 1989. By the time it was released, Bad Religion had become one of the most critically praised hardcore punk bands of the time, in spite of lack of mainstream success. 12,000 copies of No Control were originally shipped, and later ended up selling 60,000, making a grand total of 72,000 copies. Imported copies of No Control to West Germany were repackaged with a limited edition bootleg 7" of the Bad Religion EP. By 1992, No Control had sold at least 80,000 copies, becoming the band's fourth best-selling album at the time (their next album Against the Grain sold approximately 90,000 copies, while its follow-up Generator sold 85,000 and Suffer sold 88,000).

The album has received generally favorable reviews in the years since its initial release, with several reviewers having deemed No Control one of Bad Religion's best albums. Allmusic's Johnny Loftus said that it "simply and forcefully continued the shift, delivering a pummel of melodic songwriting made sharp by Greg Graffin's populist cynicism and the stinging barbs of a twin-guitar strike...", and described the change as "welcome, as it makes the band sound that much more direct on principal cuts."

In a May 2012 interview, Pennywise guitarist Fletcher Dragge stated that his band's tenth studio album All or Nothing had inspired guitarist Brett Gurewitz to write "another No Control". Rise Against cited the album as one of their 12 key influences, alongside works by Dead Kennedys, Fugazi and Jawbreaker.

On June 2, 2016, the song "Change of Ideas" was placed at No. 7 on Loudwire's top ten list "Greatest Songs Under One Minute Long".

Track listing

Release history

Other uses
 Track 2, "Big Bang" was featured on video game Tony Hawk's Underground.
 Track 3, "No Control" quotes Scottish natural historian James Hutton, "no vestige of a beginning, no prospect of an end."
 "No Control" is featured on Rock Band as a downloadable song for the game's series, along with "New Dark Ages" (from the band's 2007 album New Maps of Hell). It is also playable in Lego Rock Band.
 "Sometimes I Feel Like" was labeled as "Sometimes I Feel Like... *?!%+!*" on the disc to the original CD version.
 "You" was featured in video games Tony Hawk's Pro Skater 2 and Tony Hawk's Pro Skater HD as an in-game song and as a song in Rodney Mullen's video. It also contains the lyrics "there's no time for fussing and fighting, my friend," a direct quotation of The Beatles song, "We Can Work It Out".
 "Billy" was erroneously labeled as "Bizzy" on the cassette version.
 "The World Won't Stop" was also labeled as "The World Won't Stop Without You" on the disc to the original CD version. Also, in some software-based audio players and CD rippers that use CD lookup databases such as CDDB, "The World Won't Stop" is tagged as "The World Won't Stop Without You".
 "No Control" (along with Suffer) is also mentioned in the song "21st Century (Digital Boy)" (from 1990's Against the Grain and 1994's Stranger than Fiction), when band's guitarist Brett Gurewitz sings "tried to tell you about no control, but now I really don't know, and then you told me how bad you had to suffer, is that really all you have to offer".
 "Anxiety" is featured in the 2016 video game Forza Horizon 3.

Credits
 Greg Graffin – lead vocals
 Greg Hetson – guitar
 Brett Gurewitz – guitar, backing vocals
 Jay Bentley – bass guitar, backing vocals
 Pete Finestone – drums, percussion
 Eddie Schreyer – mastering
 Norman Moore – art direction
 Pierre Deauville – art direction

References

External links

No Control (reissue) at YouTube (streamed copy where licensed)

Bad Religion albums
1989 albums
Epitaph Records albums